Christus is the title given by the composer's brother Paul to fragments of an unfinished oratorio by Felix Mendelssohn, published posthumously as Op. 97.  The work was suggested by Christian Karl Josias von Bunsen, who compiled the German libretto from biblical sources.   Composition began in 1846 and continued through Mendelssohn's last year. The completed portions include a tenor recitative relating Christ's birth, two choruses "Wo ist der neugeborne?" ("Where is the newborn?") and "Es wird ein Stern aus Jacob aufgeh'n" ("There Shall a Star from Jacob Come Forth") using Philipp Nicolai's  chorale "Wie schön leuchtet der Morgenstern", and a passion section ending with another chorale, Paul Gerhardt's "O Welt, sieh hier dein Leben". The first performance took place in 1852.

Jeffrey S. Sposato discusses both Christus and Mendelssohn's cuts in his performing version of J. S. Bach's Matthäuspassion and claims to discern an agenda in the latter to promote "the Lutheran concept of universal guilt for Christ's death" in a manner consistent with anti-Jewish sentiment, which he was able to transcend with genuine Christian sincerity in the former.

References

External links 
 

Oratorios
Compositions by Felix Mendelssohn
1847 compositions
Oratorios based on the Bible
German-language oratorios
Unfinished musical compositions
Epiphany music
Christmas music